Callinera is a genus of worms belonging to the family Callineridae.

The species of this genus are found in Europe.

Species:

Callinera bergendali 
Callinera blanchardi 
Callinera buergeri 
Callinera emiliae 
Callinera grandis 
Callinera monensis 
Callinera nishikawai 
Callinera quatrefagesi 
Callinera zhirmunskyi

References

Nemerteans